Space Coast may refer to:

 Space Coast, Florida, USA; the region surrounding Cape Canaveral and the Kennedy Space Center
 Space Coast Regional Airport, Florida, USA
 USSSA Space Coast Complex, baseball stadium in Viera, Florida, USA
 Space Coast Junior/Senior High School, Port St. John, Florida, USA
 Brevard County, Florida, USA; the county containing Cape Canaveral and the Kennedy Space Center, with many county organs named "Space Coast"

See also

Coast (disambiguation)
Space (disambiguation)